Todd Phillips (né Bunzl, born December 20, 1970) is an American film director, producer, and screenwriter. He began his career in 1993 and directed films in the 2000s such as Road Trip, Old School, Starsky & Hutch, and School for Scoundrels. He came to wider prominence in the early 2010s for directing The Hangover film series. In 2019, he co-wrote and directed the psychological thriller film Joker, based on the DC Comics character of the same name, which premiered at the 76th Venice International Film Festival where it received the top prize, the Golden Lion. Joker went on to earn Phillips three Academy Award nominations for Best Picture, Best Director, and Best Adapted Screenplay, with his co-writer Scott Silver, his second, third, and fourth Academy Award nominations after also being nominated for Best Adapted Screenplay for Borat at the 79th Academy Awards.

Early life
Phillips was born in Brooklyn, New York City, to a Jewish family. He was raised in Dix Hills, New York, on Long Island. He attended New York University Film School, but dropped out because he could not afford to complete his first film and pay tuition simultaneously. Around that time, he worked at Kim's Video and Music.

Phillips appeared as one of the drivers in the first season of the HBO hidden camera docu-series Taxicab Confessions. In a New York Times profile, Phillips said he had gotten in trouble for shoplifting as a young man.

Career

Phillips' first documentary film, Hated: GG Allin and the Murder Junkies, centered on the life and death of controversial punk rocker GG Allin, while as a junior at NYU and it went on to become one of the highest grossing student films at the time, even getting a limited theatrical release. Phillips wrote a letter to convicted serial killer, John Wayne Gacy, an acquaintance of GG, asking if he could paint a movie poster for the film. Phillips stated that "Gacy is really the executive producer" of the film, having raised $10,000 from selling replicas of his artwork.

Next, he co-directed with then-partner Andrew Gurland for Frat House, a second documentary about college fraternities; it premiered at the 1998 Sundance Film Festival and won the Grand Jury Prize for documentary features. It was produced by HBO, but never aired on its channel because many of the film's participants claimed they were paid to re-enact their activities. It was never proven either way.

His third documentary Bittersweet Motel centered on the jam band Phish, covering its summer and fall 1997 tours, plus footage from their 1998 spring tour of Europe. It ends at The Great Went, a two-day festival held in upstate Maine which attracted 70,000 people. While at Sundance with Frat House, Phillips met director-producer Ivan Reitman who led Phillips into writing and directing his comedy films, Road Trip and Old School, for Reitman's Montecito Picture Company.

Phillips also wrote and directed the 2004 film Starsky & Hutch starring Ben Stiller and Owen Wilson, as well as the 2006 film School for Scoundrels, starring Billy Bob Thornton and Jon Heder. In 2005, Details Magazine cited Judd Apatow, Adam McKay and Phillips as "The Frat Pack". He worked on the satirical comedy Borat (2006), but he resigned his position as a director in early 2005, due to creative differences. Nevertheless, he was nominated for an Academy Award for Best Adapted Screenplay for his role in fashioning the story.

After establishing Green Hat Films in 2008, Phillips directed and produced The Hangover, that was made for a reported $35 million and went on to become the highest-grossing R-rated comedy in 2009. Its worldwide gross stood at $480 million on February 3, 2012. The film went on to win the Golden Globe for Best Picture (Musical or Comedy). It also won Best Comedy at the 2009 Broadcast Film Critics Awards. Phillips took almost no up-front salary in exchange for a large share of the film's profits, and has said that the movie's enormous success, combined with his deal, makes it "my Star Wars". After a worldwide gross of $467 million, his share in the film made Phillips around $50 million.

In 2010, Phillips directed, produced and co-wrote the comedy Due Date, which starred Robert Downey Jr. and Zach Galifianakis. It was a box office success, grossing $211,780,324 worldwide.

In the fall of 2010, production on The Hangover Part II began in Bangkok, Thailand that Phillips directed, produced and co-wrote. The film shot for 63 days and broke various records upon its release on May 26, 2011. With the film debuting at midnight with showings in 2,600 theaters, the film earned $10.4 million, breaking the record for the biggest midnight opening for an R-rated film. The Hangover Part II went on to accrue a launch day total of $31.6 million; nearly doubling The Hangovers Friday launch opening ($16.7 million). This amount broke two further records; the highest-grossing opening day for a live-action comedy and the highest-grossing opening day for an R-rated comedy film, replacing  Sex and the City ($26.7 million). The three-day opening weekend accumulated $85,946,294 – an average of $23,923 per theater – becoming the highest grossing opening weekend for a comedy film, replacing The Simpsons Movie ($74 million). For the Memorial Day four-day weekend, the film amassed $103.4 million to become the fourth-highest-grossing Memorial Day weekend opening. Finally, the film's worldwide gross of $581,464,305 beat the previous R-rated comedy record holder The Hangover to become the highest-grossing R-rated comedy film of all time (now surpassed by both Deadpool movies).

He returned to direct, write, and produce The Hangover Part III, which was released in 2013. It grossed over $300 million, pushing The Hangover Trilogys total box office gross to $1.4 billion.

In 2016, following the successes of The Hangover trilogy, Phillips directed, produced, and co-wrote the crime film War Dogs, starring Jonah Hill and Miles Teller.

Phillips directed, co-wrote, and co-produced an origin story film of DC Comics's supervillain, the Joker. The script, set in 1981, was co-written by Scott Silver, and the film starred Joaquin Phoenix in the title role. The film premiered at the 76th Venice International Film Festival and was released in October 2019.

Phillips is scheduled to direct a biographical film about Hulk Hogan, starring Chris Hemsworth in the lead role. Frequent collaborator Scott Silver is a co-writer, alongside John Pollono. Phillips is producing the film with Bradley Cooper, one of the lead actors of Phillips' The Hangover trilogy and producer on Joker.

Personal beliefs
When asked in a 2014 interview by the BBC if he believes in God, Phillips replied: "Personally I don't. But I believe there's a higher power, a collective energy in people that you might say is God".

Phillips said in 2019, in the aftermath of his dark drama Joker release, that he had stopped making comedy films because of the backlash of "woke culture", saying: "Go try to be funny nowadays... There were articles written about why comedies don't work anymore— I'll tell you why, because all the fucking funny guys are like, 'Fuck this shit, because I don't want to offend you.' It's hard to argue with 30 million people on Twitter."

Filmography

Feature films

Producer only
 All the King's Men (2006)
 Project X (2012)
 A Star Is Born (2018)
 Maestro (2023)

Acting credits

Documentary films

Television

Awards and nominations

References

External links 

 

1970 births
American male film actors
American male screenwriters
American film producers
Comedy film directors
Jewish American male actors
Jewish American writers
Living people
Tisch School of the Arts alumni
20th-century American male actors
21st-century American male actors
Male actors from New York City
Film directors from New York City
Writers from New York City
Directors of Golden Lion winners
Golden Globe Award-winning producers